Lady Ruano (born March 5, 1981) is a Colombian table tennis player. She competed at the 2016 Summer Olympics in the women's singles event, in which she was eliminated in the first round by Iveta Vacenovská.

References

External links
 

1981 births
Living people
Colombian table tennis players
Female table tennis players
Olympic table tennis players of Colombia
Table tennis players at the 2016 Summer Olympics
Table tennis players at the 2015 Pan American Games
21st-century Colombian women